Frey David Ramos Marrugo (born April 25, 1989), known as Frey Ramos, is a Colombian football midfield, who currently plays for Millonarios in the Categoría Primera A.
Ramos is a product of the Millonarios youth system and played with the Millonarios first team since August, 2008.

Statistics (Official games/Colombian Ligue and Colombian Cup)
(''As of November 14, 2010)

Notes

References

External links

 

1989 births
Living people
Colombian footballers
Millonarios F.C. players
Association football midfielders
Sportspeople from Cartagena, Colombia